The Canton Spirituals are an American gospel recording group founded in Canton, Mississippi in 1943.

Background 

The original Canton Spirituals from 1943 were Reverend Arthur Lee Jackson Sr., Reverend I.S. Watkins, Claude Nichols, Warren G. Ward, Isaac Bolton, Eddie Jackson, Theo Thompson, Roscoe Lucious and founder Harvey Lee Watkins, Sr. (December 5, 1929 – November 16, 1994).

, the group is fronted by Watkins' son, Harvey Watkins Jr., and consists of  Billy Voss, David Curry, Merlin Lucious, Shannon Lee, Rodrick Jones and Antoine Porter Sr. This incarnation garnered a Grammy Award nomination in 1993 for the album Live in Memphis and were 1997 Stellar Award recipients for "Best Group/Duo of the Year" as well as "Traditional Group of the Year" for the Living the Dream: Live In Washington, DC album. In 1998, the group took home two awards at The American Quartet Awards for "Quartet of the Year" and "Artist of the Year".

On November 1, 2012, they released a single, "Keep Knocking". The album of the same name was released on December 3, 2013.

Discography 

 That's My Train Fare Home (1977)
 On the Move (1978)
 I'm Coming Lord (1980)
 We'll See You in Church(1982)
 Everything Is Gonna Be Alright (1983)
 Meet the Same People (On Your Way Down) (1984)
 Mississippi Po' Boy (1985)
 Determined (1987)
 I'll Give It All To You (1990)
 Live in Memphis (1993)
 Live in Memphis II (1995)
 Living the Dream: Live In Washington, D.C. (1997)
 The Live Experience 1999 (1999)
 Walking By Faith (2002)
 New Life: Live In Harvey, IL (2004)
 Driven (2007)
 Keep Knocking (2013)
 Hallelujah Anyhow (2022)

Personnel 

 Harvey Watkins Jr. (1973–present): lead vocals, background vocals, bass guitar, guitars
 Merlin Lucious (1974–present): bass guitar, background vocals, drums
 David Curry III (2004–present): drums
 Billy Voss (2004–present): keyboards, background vocals
 Shannon Lee (present): keyboards, background vocals
 Rodrick Jones: (present): lead guitar
 Antoine Porter Sr. (2013–present): rhythm/lead guitar, background vocals
 Harvey Watkins, Sr. (1946–1994): original member, deceased): lead vocals, background vocals
 Jordan Bester (minister): organ
 Joshua Myles (present): lead vocals, background vocals
 Micheal Richardson (1990-1999): drums
 Victor Allen (1990-2004) :keyboards, background vocals
 Wallace Strickland (1990-2005) : keyboards, background vocals
 Cornelius Dwayne Watkins (1974-2004) : lead guitar, background vocals

References 

Musical groups established in 1943